Natesan Krishnasamy Rangasamy (born 4 August 1950) is an Indian politician who is the Chief Minister  of the Union Territory of Puducherry. He previously served as last Chief Minister of Pondicherry from 2001 to 2006 and first Chief Minister of Puducherry from 2006 to 2008 as a member of the Indian National Congress and then from 2011 to 2016 as a member of his own party, the All India N.R. Congress. He holds the record of becoming Chief Minister within three months after creating his own party. He also holds concessive record of becoming Chief Minister of Puducherry for fourth time.

Early life
 Rangasamy was born on 4 August 1950 in Puducherry to parents Natesan Krishnasamy Gounder and Panchali Ammal in a Tamil family. He got his Bachelor of Commerce degree from Tagore Arts College and BL from  Dr. Ambedkar Government Law College, Puducherry.
 Prior to entering politics (before 1990), he served as Assistant to the Minister of Puducherry V Pethaperumal.
 His first election was the contest at Thattanchavady constituency in 1990, he lost against V. Pethaperumal	JD	got 9,503 votes	and N. Rangasamy got 8,521 votes. He won the 1991 assembly election with an overwhelming majority and was appointed Minister for Agriculture and Co-operation. He was again elected from the same constituency in 1996. During 2000, he had adorned the office of the Minister for Tourism, Education, Public Works, Civil Aviation and Art & Culture. In the 2001 Assembly Election, he won from the Thattanchavady constituency and assumed office as Minister for Public Works, Agriculture and Forest. In the same year, he assumed office of the Chief Minister of Puducherry on 27 October.

Political career
 Elected Member of Legislative Assembly from Thattanchavady assembly constituency in 1991, 1996, 2001, 2006, 2021 and from Indiranagar in 2011 and 2016 and from Kathirkamam in 2011.
 1991 – Elected to Vidhan Sabha as a member of Indian National Congress.  
 1991 - Appointed Agriculture Minister
 1996 – MLA
 2000 – Education Minister
 2001 to 2008 : Chief minister, as a member of Indian National Congress 
 2011 - Quit Congress and founded his own party. 
 2011 to 2016 – Chief Minister of Puducherry, as a member of N R Congress, a party he founded himself.
 2016 to 2021 – Leader of the Opposition
 2021 to present - Chief Minister of Puducherry, as part of NDA Alliance.

During his first tenure as Chief Minister, various path breaking schemes for socio-economic development were implemented like ‘Perunthalaivar Kamarajar’ Housing Scheme for making the Union Territory of Puducherry a "Hut-free Zone", distribution of free text books, note books, rain coats, cycles, umbrellas, ‘Shri Rajiv Gandhi Breakfast Scheme’ under which hot milk and biscuits are provided to students of Govt. and Govt.-aided schools apart from mid-day meal scheme, free LPG connection with free stove and cylinder to BPL families, 50% concession on stamp duty for immovable property registered in the name of Women and full reimbursement of tuition fees for students selected through CENTAC for pursuing Medicine and Engineering courses.

Chief Minister of Puducherry

In Puducherry he was always called as People chief minister (makkal mudhalvar) due to noteworthy achievements in education including free education through good government schools, old age pension scheme, free reimbursements for professional and non-professional college students. He laid the foundation for the first government medical college at Kathirkamam. His welfare schemes include distribution of wheat through PDS for the poor diabetics who have crossed the age of 60, a Mid-day Meal Scheme and breakfast schemes for the poor school children and reimbursing the school and college tuition fees to students. Rangaswamy resigned as Chief Minister on 28 August 2008; Indian National Congress had asked him to resign due to internal politics. After resigning from Indian National Congress, he started a new political party called All India NR Congress on 7 February 2011. Within three months, in the 2011 Legislative Assembly Elections, his party won 15 seats out of 17 seats it contested and its alliance partner, All India Anna Dravida Munnetra Kazhagam got 5 out of 10 seats it contested.

Elections contested and results

References

External links

|-

1950 births
Living people
Chief ministers of Puducherry
Indian National Congress politicians from Puducherry
All India NR Congress politicians
Indian political party founders
Chief ministers from Indian National Congress
Leaders of the Opposition in Puducherry
State cabinet ministers of Puducherry
Puducherry MLAs 2011–2016
Puducherry MLAs 2016–2021
Puducherry MLAs 2021–2026
Puducherry MLAs 1991–1996
Puducherry MLAs 1996–2001
Puducherry MLAs 2001–2006
Puducherry MLAs 2006–2011